Battista da Vicenza (circa 1375 – 1438) was an Italian painter of the early Renaissance period.

He was born and active in Vicenza. He painted in this town between 1404 and 1438. Among his works are four panels depicting the Life of Saint Sylvester, now housed in the Museo Civico of the Palazzo Chiericati in Vicenza. The scenes are painted against gilded backgrounds.

References

1370 births
1438 deaths
15th-century Italian painters
Italian male painters
People from Vicenza
Painters from Vicenza